William Gilmour is a writer of lost race fantasy short stories and novels.  A key figure in the Edgar Rice Burroughs pastiche community, he published  Tarzan pastiches in the magazine Burroughs Bulletin.  His lost race novel, The Undying Land was published by Donald M. Grant, Publisher, Inc. in 1985.

Notes

External links

Year of birth missing (living people)
Living people
20th-century American novelists
American fantasy writers
American male novelists
American male short story writers
20th-century American short story writers
20th-century American male writers